Renewable and Sustainable Energy Reviews is a peer-reviewed scientific journal covering research on sustainable energy. It is published in 12 issues per year by Elsevier and the editor-in-chief is Aoife M. Foley (Queen's University Belfast). According to the Journal Citation Reports, the journal has a 2021 impact factor of 16.799.

The journal considers articles based on the themes of energy resources, applications, utilization, environment, techno-socio-economic aspects, systems, and sustainability.

References

External links

Elsevier academic journals
Publications established in 1997
English-language journals
Energy and fuel journals
Monthly journals